Park Mains High School is a secondary school in Erskine, Renfrewshire. It is one of the biggest schools in Scotland. As well as taking in students from the town it also enrolls them from the surrounding areas of Bishopton (including the new Dargavel Village), Inchinnan, and Langbank.

New school building (2012-present)
Renfrewshire Council granted a new multimillion-pound rebuild of the school. The new building was opened in August 2012 at a cost of £31m. It was designed and planned by Holmes Miller. Construction was completed by Bam Construction. FES Ltd were the contractors for the electrical, mechanical, IT installations and fire and security systems. The building offers a larger, brighter space for the pupils to feel in a social hub whilst still being in a controlled learning environment. One key feature of the school is the central 'street area' with natural sunlight. The school's new sports complex has a multi-use games hall and gymnasium. The site of the old school building is now a £400,000 multi-use 3G sports pitch with running track. There are also hockey pitches and a rugby field. The school building has regularly featured in architectural publications. It has received award nominations for its design and construction.

Guidance
Pupils are assigned to a guidance group in their first year at Park Mains. The guidance groups are named after some of the Scottish Isles. These are Skye, Arran, Bute and Mull. Pupils remain in these groups until their departure from the school.

Notable former pupils

Chris Aitken, former footballer, now assistant manager at East Kilbride FC 
Stephen Aitken, Former footballer, now manager at East Kilbride thistle
Wendy Alexander, Former leader of the Scottish Labour Party
Douglas Alexander, Former Labour Shadow Foreign Secretary
Kenny Inglis, Composer & music producer 
Keith Lasley, Former footballer, now assistant manager at Motherwell FC
Peter Leven, Former footballer, assistant manager at Kilmarnock FC
Derek Lilley, Former footballer
Kirsty Mitchell, actress and former Miss Scotland
Brian O'Neil, former footballer 
Blair Spittal, Footballer at Ross County
Dougie Vipond, TV presenter & Deacon Blue drummer

References

http://parkmains.com/welcome/information/school-handbook/

External links
Mains High School Official Website
Park Mains High School @ Scottish Schools Online

Secondary schools in Renfrewshire
Educational institutions established in 1974
1974 establishments in Scotland
Erskine, Renfrewshire
School buildings completed in 2012